Turrinae is a former subfamily  of predatory sea snails, marine gastropod mollusks in the family Turridae the turrids.

Genera 
Genera in the subfamily Turrinae include:

Austrogemmula  Laseron, 1954: synonym of Epidirella Iredale, 1931 (junior objective synonym of Epidirella)
Cretaspira Kuroda & Oyama, 1971
Cryptogemma Dall, 1918
Decollidrillia Habe & Ito, 1965
Epidirona Iredale, 1931
Fusiturris Thiele, 1929
Gemmula Weinkauff, 1875
Gemmuloborsonia Shuto, 1989
Iotyrris Medinskaya & Sysoev, 2001
Kuroshioturris Shuto, 1961
Lophiotoma Casey, 1904
Lophioturris Powell, 1964
Lucerapex Wenz, 1943
Pinguigemmula McNeil, 1961
Polystira Woodring, 1928
Ptychosyrinx Thiele, 1925
Riuguhdrillia Oyama, 1951
Sinistrella Meyer, 1887
Turris Röding, 1798
Unedogemmula MacNeil, 1961
Viridoturris Powell, 1964
Xenuroturris Iredale, 1929
Zemacies Finlay, 1926

References

Further reading 
 Kantor Y. I. (2006). "On the morphology and homology of the “central tooth” in the radulae of Turrinae (Conoidea: Turridae)". Ruthenica 16: 47–52.
 Vaught K. C. (1989). A classification of the living Mollusca. American Malacologists: Melbourne, FL (USA). . XII, 195 pp.

Turridae